2017–18 Belarusian Cup was the twenty seventh season of the Belarusian annual cup competition. Contrary to the league season, it was conducted in a fall-spring rhythm. It started in May 2017 and concluded with the final match on 19 May 2018. Winners of the Cup qualified for the second qualifying round of the 2018–19 UEFA Europa League.

Participating clubs 
The following teams took part in the competition:

First round
In this round 4 amateur clubs were drawn against 4 Second League clubs. The draw was performed on 6 May 2017. The matches were played on 17 May 2017.

Another 2 amateur clubs and 10 Second League clubs were given a bye to the Second Round.

Second round
In this round 4 winners of the First Round with 12 clubs that received a bye were drawn against 16 First League. The draw was performed on 22 May 2017. The matches were played on 14 June 2017.

Round of 32
In this round 16 winners of the Second Round were drawn against 16 Premier League clubs. The matches were played between 5 and 9 July 2017.

Round of 16
Most of the matches were played on 22 and 23 July 2017.

Quarter-finals
The draw was made on 28 July 2017. The matches were played in March 2018.

|}

First leg

Second leg

Semi-finals
The draw was made on 19 March 2018. The matches will be played in April and May 2018.

|}

First leg

Second leg

Final
The final was played on 19 May 2018 at Spartak Stadium in Mogilev.

References

External links
 Football.by
 Soccerway

2017–18 European domestic association football cups
Cup
Cup
2017-18